Tatami (畳具足), or tatami gusoku (from tatamu 畳む, "to fold") and gusoku (meaning full suit of armour), was a type of lightweight portable folding Japanese armour worn during the feudal era of Japan by the samurai class and their foot soldiers (ashigaru).  The Tatami dō (a foldable cuirass) or the tatami katabira (an armoured jacket) were the main components of a full suit of tatami armour.

Structure
A tatami gusoku (complete suit of folding armor) includes a tatami dō or tatami katabira (jacket) and a tatami kabuto (helmet) chochin kabuto, or tatami zukin (hood) or similar type of head protection along with the other related parts of a full suit of Japanese armour. Collapsible head protection such as hachi gane and other collapsible armor are also tatami armor; a traditional kabuto could also be part of a tatami gusoku. 

Tatami armour was lightweight, portable, convenient for transportation, and they were manufactured inexpensively for the ashigaru light infantry. Tatami armours were worn by all samurai classes from the highest class to the lowest class.  The higher class samurai wore elaborate armour while the lower class samurai and retainers wore simpler versions.

In his book Arms and Armor of the Samurai: The History of Weaponry in Ancient Japan Ian Bottomley shows a karuta tatami do and a karuta tatami kabuto (p. 88), and discusses  different types of tatami dō karuta gane dō and kikko gane dō on p. 91. George Cameron Stone shows a kikko tatami armor on p. 606 of his book A glossary of the construction, decoration, and use of arms and armor.

Types of Tatami armour

Karuta tatami armour
Karuta are small lacquered square or rectangular iron (sometimes leather) plates usually connected together by chainmail and sewn to a cloth backing.

Kikko tatami armour
Kikko are small iron or leather hexagon plates usually connected together by kusari or chainmail, and sewn to a cloth backing.

Kusari tatami armour
Kusari is mail or chain armour, normally sewn to a cloth or leather backing.

See also 

 Dou (dō)
 Plated mail
 Brigandine
 Kikko (Japanese armour)
 Karuta (Japanese armour)
 Kusari (Japanese mail armour)
 Japanese armour

References

External links

Samurai Arms and Armor
Anthony Bryant's online Japanese armour manual

Japanese clothing
Samurai armour